Waun-gron Park railway station serves the Fairwater area of Cardiff, Wales. Passenger services are currently operated by Transport for Wales.

The station was opened in 1987 when a passenger service was introduced to the City Line, though the line itself opened in 1859 and was originally goods only. The station has an unusual staggered platform arrangement, one platform straddles the bridge over the roadway.

Waun-gron Park is the nearest station to the large suburb of Ely which is 10 minutes' walk from the station along Western Avenue and over Ely Bridge.

Services
The Monday to Friday off-peak service is two trains per hour each way.

Journey times from Waun-gron Park are eight minutes to Cardiff Central, 11 minutes to Radyr and 28 minutes to Coryton.

See also
List of railway stations in Cardiff
Rail transport in Cardiff

References

External links

Railway stations in Cardiff
DfT Category F2 stations
Railway stations opened by British Rail
Railway stations in Great Britain opened in 1987
Railway stations served by Transport for Wales Rail